Massachusetts's 1st congressional district is a United States congressional district located in the western and central part of Massachusetts. The state's largest congressional district in area, it covers about one-third of the state and is more rural than the rest. It has the state's highest point, Mount Greylock; the district includes the cities of Springfield, West Springfield, Pittsfield, Holyoke, Agawam, Chicopee and Westfield.

The shape of the district underwent some changes effective from the elections of 2012, after Massachusetts congressional redistricting to reflect the 2010 census. The old 1st and 2nd districts were essentially merged, placing most of western Massachusetts in a single district. The entire Springfield area is included in the new 1st district, and the Worcester County areas of the old 1st district were split between the new 2nd and 3rd districts.

Richard Neal, a Democrat from Springfield, represents the district; he previously represented the old 2nd from 1989 to 2013.

Cities and towns currently in the district 
All of Berkshire County, all of Hampden County (except for Precinct 1A in Palmer), and the following towns and cities:

In Franklin County: Ashfield, Bernardston, Buckland, Charlemont, Colrain, Conway, Hawley, Heath, Leyden, Monroe, Rowe, and Shelburne.

In Hampshire County: Chesterfield, Cummington, Easthampton, Goshen, Granby, Huntington, Middlefield, Plainfield, South Hadley, Southampton, Westhampton, Williamsburg, and Worthington.

In Worcester County: Brookfield, Charlton, Dudley, East Brookfield, Southbridge, Sturbridge, and Warren.

Recent election results from presidential races

List of members representing the district

Recent election results

2002

2004

2006

2008

2010

2012

2014

2016

2018

2020

2022

See also 

 Massachusetts's congressional districts
 List of United States congressional districts

Notes

References

Further reading

External links 

 
 
 
 
 
 

01
Government of Berkshire County, Massachusetts
Government of Franklin County, Massachusetts
Government of Hampden County, Massachusetts
Government of Hampshire County, Massachusetts
Government of Middlesex County, Massachusetts
Government in Worcester County, Massachusetts
1789 establishments in Massachusetts
Constituencies established in 1789